Gavin Campbell, 1st Marquess of Breadalbane  (9 April 1851 – 19 October 1922), styled Lord Glenorchy between 1862 and 1871 and known as The Earl of Breadalbane and Holland between 1871 and 1885, was a Scottish nobleman and Liberal politician.

Background and education
Campbell was born at Fermoy, County Cork, the eldest son of John Campbell, 6th Earl of Breadalbane and Holland, by Mary Theresa, daughter of John Edwards, of Dublin. He was educated at St Andrews. After his father succeeded in the earldom of Breadalbane and Holland in 1862, Campbell became known by the courtesy title Lord Glenorchy. until he succeeded his father in the earldom in 1871.

Military and political career
Breadalbane served as a lieutenant in the 4th Battalion, Argyll and Sutherland Highlanders from 1873 to 1874. He was later in the Shropshire Yeomanry, from entering as Sub-Lieutenant in 1877, being promoted lieutenant in 1882, retiring as captain in 1887. From 1897 to 1910 he was Lieutenant-Colonel commanding the Highland Cyclist Battalion, of which he became Honorary Colonel in 1913, and was appointed an Aide-de-Camp for volunteers to King Edward VII with the substantive rank of colonel in January 1903.

As his earldom was a Scottish peerage it did not entitle him to an automatic seat in the House of Lords. However, in 1873 he was created Baron Breadalbane, of Kenmure in the County of Perth, in the Peerage of the United Kingdom, which gave him a seat in the House of Lords. That same year he was appointed a Lord-in-waiting in the Liberal administration of William Ewart Gladstone. The Liberals fell from power in 1874 but returned to office in 1880, when Breadalbane was sworn of the Privy Council and appointed Treasurer of the Household by Gladstone, a post he held until 1885. The latter year he was created Earl of Ormelie, in the County of Caithness, and Marquess of Breadalbane, in the Peerage of the United Kingdom.

Lord Breadalbane did not serve in Gladstone's brief 1886 administration, but once again held office as Lord Steward of the Household from 1892 to 1895, firstly under Gladstone and from 1894 under the premiership of Lord Rosebery. In 1894 he was appointed a Knight of the Garter. He also served as Lord High Commissioner to the General Assembly of the Church of Scotland in 1893, 1894 and 1895 and as Lord Lieutenant of Argyllshire from 1914 until 1922 and was the last holder of the office of Keeper of the Privy Seal of Scotland, which he held from 1907 until his death in 1922 in Glasgow.

He was a Knight of the Order of the Seraphim of Sweden and a Knight of Justice of the Order of St John of Jerusalem (KStJ), in which capacity he represented King Edward VII during the dedication in June 1902 of the restored chapel at Marienburg Castle, originally the seat of the Teutonic Order. He was awarded the silver medal of the Royal Humane Society, and was also a Brigadier-General of the Royal Company of Archers.

Personal life
Lord Breadalbane married Lady Alma Imogen Carlotta Leonore Graham, the youngest daughter of James Graham, 4th Duke of Montrose, in 1872. They had no children. He died at the Central Station Hotel in Glasgow in October 1922, aged 71, and was buried at Finlarig.

The barony of Breadalbane, earldom of Ormelie and marquessate of Breadalbane became extinct on his death, while he was succeeded in his Scottish titles by his nephew Iain. Lady Breadalbane died in May 1932, aged 77.

References

External links

1851 births
Alumni of the University of St Andrews
1922 deaths
Members of the Privy Council of the United Kingdom
Knights of the Garter
Gavin Campbell, 1st Marquess of Breadalbane
Argyll and Sutherland Highlanders officers
Liberal Party (UK) Lords-in-Waiting
Lord-Lieutenants of Argyllshire
Treasurers of the Household
Shropshire Yeomanry officers
Lords High Commissioner to the General Assembly of the Church of Scotland
Directors of the Caledonian Railway
Members of the Royal Company of Archers
Gavin
Peers of the United Kingdom created by Queen Victoria